The Teatar.hr Award, also known as the Croatian Theatre Award - Public Vote is an annual award brought by the Zagreb-based web portal Teatar.hr, to honour excellence in theatre activity. Introduced in 2012, winners receive a glass plaque with the symbol of Teatar.hr.

2012 Croatian Theatre Awards - Public Vote

2013 Croatian Theatre Awards - Public Vote

2014 Croatian Theatre Awards - Public Vote

2015 Croatian Theatre Awards - Public Vote

References

Awards established in 2012
Croatian awards
Theatre acting awards